Plogastel-Saint-Germain s a commune in the department of Finistère, in the Brittany region, 15 km west of Quimper. Belonging to Pays Bigouden, within the former political and religious region of Cornouaille, its territory of 31 km2 has a resolutely rural character. There is still a large majority of cultivated land and agricultural areas (80% of its area), not to mention forests (10%) and meadows (8%).The municipalities (or old municipalities, urban areas) bordering Ploegastel-Saint-Germain include: Gourlizon, Landudec, Peumerit，Plonéour-Lanvern, Plovan, Pluguffan,Plozévet.

Population
Inhabitants of Plogastel-Saint-Germain are called in French
Plogastellois.

See also
Communes of the Finistère department

References

External links

Official website 

Mayors of Finistère Association 

Communes of Finistère